Jansen Mani Rios (born October 28, 1991) is a Filipino professional basketball player for the Meralco Bolts of the Philippine Basketball Association (PBA). He was selected 25th overall in the 2015 PBA draft.

Collegiate career
He was recruited by Leo Austria to play basketball for the Adamson Falcons.

Professional career
Rios was drafted 25th overall by the NLEX Road Warriors in the 2015 PBA draft.

On January 25, 2020, Rios signed a one-year contract with the Phoenix Super LPG Fuel Masters after not being offered a contract by NLEX. He signed a two-year extension with Phoenix on February 15, 2021.

After his contract ended with Phoenix, Rios signed a one-year contract with the Meralco Bolts on January 19, 2023.

Personal life
Basketball was not his first sport. Jansen played center forward for his elementary and high school teams. And growing up, he rooted for Liverpool FC where aside from Steven Gerrard, he observed the techniques of former striker, the 6’8” Peter Crouch. Watching Crouch closely, Rios, standing at 6’2” used his height advantage in winning headers and corners to score goals.

PBA career statistics

As of the end of 2021 season

Season-by-season averages

|-
| align=left | 
| align=left | NLEX
| 3 || 3.0 || .000 || .000 || .750 || .0 || .0 || .0 || .0 || 1.0
|-
| align=left | 
| align=left | NLEX
| 29 || 13.5 || .362 || .323 || .654 || 2.6 || 1.1 || .9 || .3 || 4.5
|-
| align=left | 
| align=left | NLEX
| 20 || 9.5 || .358 || .269 || .500 || 1.2 || 1.5 || .3 || .4 || 2.9
|-
| align=left | 
| align=left | NLEX
| 14 || 11.2 || .526 || .368 || .500 || 1.8 || .9 || .6 || .1 || 3.8
|-
| align=left | 
| align=left | Phoenix
| 17 || 10.8 || .423 || .263 || .714 || 1.8 || .6 || .4 || .2 || 3.2
|-
| align=left | 
| align=left | Phoenix
| 23 || 8.8 || .339 || .258 || .250 || 1.0 || .4 || .4 || .1 || 2.2
|-class=sortbottom
| align=center colspan=2 | Career
| 106 || 10.7 || .383 || .297 || .593 || 1.7 || .9 || .5 || .2 || 3.3

References

1991 births
Living people
Adamson Soaring Falcons basketball players
Filipino men's basketball players
Meralco Bolts players
NLEX Road Warriors draft picks
NLEX Road Warriors players
Phoenix Super LPG Fuel Masters players
Shooting guards
Small forwards
Sportspeople from Romblon